Yoshimune Sano (born Yoshimune Kato,  April 30, 1979) is a Japanese former professional basketball player who played for the Akita Northern Happinets of the bj League in Japan.　He played college basketball for Nihon University.

Career statistics

Regular season 

|-
|style="text-align:left;"|2007-08
|style="text-align:left;"|Hokkaido
| 16 ||   ||8.7  || .333 || .000 || .667 ||1.2 ||0.1 || 0.1|| 0.1 ||1.8
|-
|style="text-align:left;"|2010-11
|style="text-align:left;"|Hamamatsu
| 13 || 2  ||3.5  || .000 || .000 || .250 ||0.6 ||0.2 || 0.0|| 0.0 ||0.1
|-
|style="text-align:left;"|2011-12
|style="text-align:left;"|Akita
| 44 || 12  ||10.4 || .607 || .000 || .459 ||1.6 ||0.5 || 0.1|| 0.1 ||1.2
|-
|style="text-align:left;"|2012-13
|style="text-align:left;"|Akita
| 37 || 10  ||10.8 || .467 || .000 || .467 ||1.8 ||0.1 || 0.3|| 0.1 ||0.9
|-
|style="text-align:left;"|2013-14
|style="text-align:left;"|Akita
| 23 || 4  ||5.1 || .667 || .000 || .500 ||0.4 ||0.2 || 0.1|| 0.0 ||0.4
|-
|style="text-align:left;"|2014-15
|style="text-align:left;"|Fukuoka
| 38 || 18  ||11.7 || .500 || .000 || .406 ||1.1 ||0.3 || 0.3|| 0.1 ||1.2
|-
|- class="sortbottom"
! style="text-align:center;" colspan=2| Career 2007-15
! 171||  ||  9.4|| .476||  .000||  .467|| 1.3|| 0.3|| 0.2|| 0.1||1.0

Playoffs 

|-
|style="text-align:left;"|2010-11
|style="text-align:left;"|Hamamatsu
| 3 ||  ||3.3  || .000 || .000 || .500 ||0.3 ||0.0 || 0.0|| 0.0 ||0.7
|-
|style="text-align:left;"|2013-14
|style="text-align:left;"|Akita
| 2 || 0 ||2.00  || .000 || .000 || .000 ||0.0 ||0.5 || 0|| 0 ||0
|-

References

1979 births
Living people
Akita Northern Happinets players
Alvark Tokyo players
Japanese men's basketball players
Levanga Hokkaido players
Nihon University Red Sharks men's basketball players
San-en NeoPhoenix players
Sun Rockers Shibuya players
People from Fujinomiya, Shizuoka
Sportspeople from Shizuoka Prefecture
Centers (basketball)